McKinley Howard "Kenny" Dorham (August 30, 1924 – December 5, 1972) was an American jazz trumpeter, singer, and composer. Dorham's talent is frequently lauded by critics and other musicians, but he never received the kind of attention or public recognition from the jazz establishment that many of his peers did. For this reason, writer Gary Giddins said that Dorham's name has become "virtually synonymous with underrated." Dorham composed the jazz standard "Blue Bossa", which first appeared on Joe Henderson's album Page One.

Biography
Dorham was one of the most active bebop trumpeters. He played in the big bands of Lionel Hampton, Billy Eckstine, Dizzy Gillespie, and Mercer Ellington and the quintet of Charlie Parker. He joined Parker's band in December 1948. He was a charter member of the original cooperative Jazz Messengers. He also recorded as a sideman with Thelonious Monk and Sonny Rollins, and he replaced Clifford Brown in the Max Roach Quintet after Brown's death in 1956. In addition to sideman work, Dorham led his own groups, including the Jazz Prophets (formed shortly after Art Blakey took over the Jazz Messengers name). The Jazz Prophets, featuring a young Bobby Timmons on piano, bassist Sam Jones, and tenorman J. R. Monterose, with guest Kenny Burrell on guitar, recorded a live album 'Round About Midnight at the Cafe Bohemia in 1956 for Blue Note.

In 1963, Dorham added the 26-year-old tenor saxophonist Joe Henderson to his group, which later recorded Una Mas (the group also featured a young Tony Williams). The friendship between the two musicians led to a number of other albums, such as Henderson's Page One, Our Thing and In 'n Out. Dorham recorded frequently throughout the 1960s for Blue Note and Prestige Records, as leader and as sideman for Henderson, Jackie McLean, Cedar Walton, Andrew Hill, Milt Jackson and others.

Dorham's later quartet consisted of some well-known jazz musicians: Tommy Flanagan (piano), Paul Chambers (double bass), and Art Taylor (drums). Their recording debut was Quiet Kenny for the Prestige Records' New Jazz label, an album which featured mostly ballads. An earlier quartet featuring Dorham as co-leader with alto saxophone player Ernie Henry had released an album together under the name "Kenny Dorham/Ernie Henry Quartet." They produced the album 2 Horns / 2 Rhythm for Riverside Records in 1957 with double bassist Eddie Mathias and drummer G.T. Hogan. In 1990 the album was re-released on CD under the name "Kenny Dorham Quartet featuring Ernie Henry."

During his final years Dorham suffered from kidney disease, from which he died on December 5, 1972, aged 48.

Discography

As leader 
 1953: Kenny Dorham Quintet (Debut)
 1955: Afro-Cuban (Blue Note)
 1956: 'Round About Midnight at the Cafe Bohemia (Blue Note)
 1956: And The Jazz Prophets Vol. 1 (ABC-Paramount ABC-122)
 1957: Jazz Contrasts featuring Sonny Rollins (Riverside, 1957)
 1957: 2 Horns / 2 Rhythm featuring Ernie Henry (Riverside, 1957)
 1958: This Is the Moment! (Riverside, 1958)
 1959: Blue Spring with Cannonball Adderley (Riverside, 1959) 
 1959: Quiet Kenny (New Jazz, 1960)
 1960: The Arrival of Kenny Dorham (Jaro International, 1960) – reissued as The Kenny Dorham Memorial Album (Xanadu, 1976)
 1960: Jazz Contemporary (Time, 1960)
 1960: Showboat (Time, 1961)
 1961: Whistle Stop (Blue Note, 1961)
 1961: Hot Stuff From Brazil (West Wind, 1990)
 1961: Inta Somethin' with Jackie McLean (Pacific Jazz, 1962) – live
 1962: Matador (United Artists, 1963)
 1963: Una Mas (Blue Note, 1964)
 1963: Scandia Skies (SteepleChase, 1980)
 1963: Short Story (SteepleChase, 1979)
 1964: Trompeta Toccata (Blue Note, 1965)

As sideman 

With Art Blakey
 The Jazz Messengers at the Cafe Bohemia Volume 1 (Blue Note, 1955) – live
 The Jazz Messengers at the Cafe Bohemia Volume 2 (Blue Note, 1955) – live

With Joe Henderson
 Page One (Blue Note, 1963)
 Our Thing (Blue Note, 1963)
 In 'n Out (Blue Note, 1964)

With Ernie Henry
 Presenting Ernie Henry (Riverside, 1956)
 Last Chorus (Riverside, 1958) – rec. 1956–57

With Milt Jackson
 Roll 'Em Bags (Savoy, 1949)
 Invitation (Riverside, 1962)

With Clifford Jordan
 Starting Time (Jazzland, 1961)
 In the World (Strata-East, 1972) – rec. 1969

With Abbey Lincoln
 That's Him! (Riverside, 1957)
 It's Magic (Riverside, 1958)
 Abbey Is Blue (Riverside, 1959)

With Hank Mobley
 Mobley's 2nd Message (Prestige, 1956)
 Curtain Call (Blue Note, 1957)

With Cecil Payne
 1956: Patterns of Jazz (Savoy, 1957)
 1968: Zodiac (Strata-East, 1973)

With Max Roach
 Max Roach + 4 (EmArcy, 1956)
 Jazz in ¾ Time (EmArcy, 1957) – rec. 1956–57
 MAX (Argo, 1958)
 The Max Roach 4 Plays Charlie Parker (EmArcy, 1959) – rec. 1957–58

With Sonny Rollins
 1954: Moving Out (Prestige, 1956)
 1956: Rollins Plays for Bird (Prestige, 1957)
 1956: Sonny Boy (Prestige, 1961)

With Barney Wilen
 Barney (RCA, 1959)
 Un Temoin Dans La Ville (Fontana, 1959)

With others
 Charlie Parker, Swedish Schnapps (Verve, 1958) – compilation
 Toshiko Akiyoshi, Toshiko at Top of the Gate (Nippon Columbia, 1968) – reissued by Denon
 Dave Bailey, Bash! (Jazzline, 1961) - reissued as Tommy Flanagan Trio And Sextet (Onyx/Xanadu, 1973) and under Dorham's name as Osmosis (Black Lion, 1990)
 Andy Bey, Andy and the Bey Sisters (Fontana, 1959) – reissued as Emarcy CD)
 The Birdland Stars, On Tour Vol.1 & 2 (RCA Victor, 1956)
 Rocky Boyd, Ease It (Jazztime, 1961) – reissued as West 42nd Street on Black Lion under Dorham's name
 Kenny Burrell, Kenny Burrell (Blue Note BLP 1543, 1956) – 1 track
 Tadd Dameron, Fontainebleau (Prestige, 1956)
 Lou Donaldson, Quartet/Quintet/Sextet (Blue Note, 1957) – rec. 1952–54
 Matthew Gee, Jazz by Gee (Riverside, 1956)
 Herb Geller, Fire in the West (Jubilee, 1957) – aka That Geller Feller (Fresh Sound, 2003)
 Benny Golson, The Modern Touch (Riverside, 1958) – rec. 1957
 Barry Harris, Bull's Eye! (Prestige, 1968)
 Andrew Hill, Point of Departure (Blue Note, 1965) – rec. 1964
 Harold Land, Eastward Ho! Harold Land in New York (Jazzland, 1960)
 Jackie McLean, Vertigo (Blue Note, 1980) – rec. 1959–63
 John Mehegan, Casual Affair (TJ, 1959)
 Gil Mellé, Gil's Guests (Prestige, 1956)
 Helen Merrill, You've Got a Date with the Blues (MetroJazz, 1959)
 Thelonious Monk, Genius of Modern Music: Volume 2 (Blue Note, 1952)
 Oliver Nelson, Meet Oliver Nelson (New Jazz, 1959)
 Oscar Pettiford, The Oscar Pettiford Orchestra in Hi-Fi Volume Two (ABC-Paramount, 1957)
 A. K. Salim, Pretty for the People (Savoy, 1957)
 Horace Silver, Horace Silver and the Jazz Messengers (Blue Note, 1956) – rec. 1954–55
 Cecil Taylor, Hard Driving Jazz (United Artists, 1958) – reissued by Blue Note
 Cedar Walton, Cedar! (Prestige, 1967)
 Randy Weston, Live at the Five Spot (United Artists, 1959) – live
 Phil Woods, Pairing Off (Prestige, 1956)

References 

1924 births
1972 deaths
People from Freestone County, Texas
African-American jazz musicians
American jazz trumpeters
American male trumpeters
Bebop trumpeters
Mainstream jazz trumpeters
Hard bop trumpeters
The Jazz Messengers members
American jazz singers
American jazz composers
American male jazz composers
Savoy Records artists
Xanadu Records artists
Muse Records artists
Riverside Records artists
Blue Note Records artists
20th-century African-American male singers
20th-century American composers
20th-century jazz composers